NCNC may refer to:

National Captive Nations Committee
National Council of Nigeria and the Cameroons